William F. Groves (September 23, 1893 – July 30, 1963) was an American politician and farmer.

Born on a farm near Lodi, Wisconsin, Groves graduated from Lodi High School, went to University of Wisconsin and was a dairy farmer. He was president of the Pure Milk Products Cooperative (PMPC) and the Wisconsin Dairy Federation. Groves also served on the Lodi School Board and was the treasurer. In 1935 and 1936, Groves served in the Wisconsin State Assembly as a Progressive. From 1959 to 1961, Groves lived in Madison, Wisconsin, where he was the farm director for WISC-TV. Groves was also a columnist for the Wisconsin Agriculturist and Dairyland News. He died unexpectedly at his home in Lodi, Wisconsin.

References

1893 births
1963 deaths
People from Lodi, Wisconsin
University of Wisconsin–Madison alumni
Farmers from Wisconsin
Journalists from Wisconsin
Wisconsin Progressives (1924)
School board members in Wisconsin
Members of the Wisconsin State Assembly
20th-century American politicians
People from Madison, Wisconsin
20th-century American journalists
American male journalists